The 2001 Kazakhstan Premier League was the tenth season of the Kazakhstan Premier League, the highest football league competition in Kazakhstan, and took place between 28 April and 22 October.

Teams
Zhiger were relegated at the end of the 2000 season, and were replaced by FC Aktobe-Lento, FC Mangystau and Atyrau. Batyr were reformed as Ekibastuzets-NK and CSKA Kairat became Kairat.

In addition to the changes in clubs in the Kazakhstan Premier League, there weer various name changes as well. Access-Golden-Grain became Esil Bogatyr, Akmola became Esil and Kaisar-Hurricane returned to being called Kaisar.

Team overview

League table

Results

Season statistics

Top scorers

References

Kazakhstan Premier League seasons
1
Kazakh
Kazakh